Kirby's Dream Course is a 1994 miniature golf video game developed by HAL Laboratory and Nintendo EAD and published by Nintendo for the Super Nintendo Entertainment System (SNES). A spin-off of the Kirby series and the first released for the SNES, players control the pink spherical character Kirby through a series of courses by launching him towards the goal hole at the end. Kirby can hit enemies to collect power-ups that grant him unique abilities, such as those that allow him to destroy certain obstacles or fly around the level.

HAL Laboratory originally designed Dream Course as a standalone game called Special Tee Shot. Though it was previewed in several magazines and displayed on the packaging for the console, HAL replaced the game's original characters with those from the Kirby series following its popularity on the Game Boy. Special Tee Shot was later released for the Satellaview peripheral in Japan. Dream Course received favorable reviews, both at release and retrospectively, for its unique design and absurdity. Some were critical of its high difficulty level and controls. It has been re-released through the Wii and Wii U Virtual Console digital storefronts and the Super NES Classic Edition. A sequel for the Nintendo 64 was in development but later canceled.

Gameplay

Kirby's Dream Course is a mini golf video game set at an isometric perspective, similar to games such as Marble Madness (1984). Its plot involves Kirby's nemesis King Dedede stealing all of the stars in the night sky. Kirby sets out to stop Dedede and return the stars to the sky.

Players maneuver Kirby (or in the case of player two, a yellow Kirby look-alike named ) around a miniature golf course by deflecting him towards a specific area of the playfield. Players must set the power, angle, and spin to connect with various enemies found throughout the levels, claiming a star. When only one enemy remains, that enemy transforms into the goal hole (providing two stars). In multiplayer, players compete for the most stars, and a player may connect with a star claimed by the other player for themself (turning pink to yellow and vice versa). Kirby/Keeby can knock himself into certain enemies to acquire a Copy ability, which can be used to clear courses in a faster period of time or hinder the other player. These Copy abilities include Kirby/Keeby turning into a tornado, a sparking ball that can destroy certain obstacles, and a UFO that allows Kirby/Keeby to float and move at will for a short time.

The game has eight single-player courses, with eight holes in each. Completing courses awards the player with medals, which can be used to unlock extra features such as alternative versions of courses. The type of medal awarded is based on how well the player performed, with gold being the best.

Development

Kirby's Dream Course was developed by HAL Laboratory and Nintendo EAD and published by Nintendo for the Super Nintendo Entertainment System (SNES). HAL originally designed the game as a standalone title called Special Tee Shot in 1992, which featured its own original characters and art assets. Though it received several previews from magazines and was displayed prominently on the packaging for the console, the company shelved the project following the success of its Kirby series on the Game Boy. HAL later reworked Special Tee Shot into a Kirby game by replacing many of the original characters with those from the Kirby series, and implementing several mechanics to make it fit into the Kirby universe, such as the power-up system.

Keeby, the yellow second player character, repurposes the initial proposition for Kirby's color made by game developer Shigeru Miyamoto, which was rejected by series creator Masahiro Sakurai in favor of pink by the time of development for Kirby's Adventure (1993). The character's name is a portmanteau of 黄色 kīro "yellow" and カービィ Kābī "Kirby". Following the appearance of an unnamed yellow Kirby in Kirby: Nightmare in Dream Land (2002), a yellow color palette became a recurring colorization for additional players playing as a Kirby in the Kirby and Super Smash Bros. series (often as the second player). This palette was named once as "Keeby Yellow" in Kirby's Dream Buffet (2022).

Kirby's Dream Course was released in Japan on September 21, 1994, as Kirby Ball. It was released in North America on February 1, 1995, and in Europe later in the year. Special Tee Shot was later re-released in 1996 for the Satellaview, a peripheral for the Super Famicom that played games via satellite broadcasts. Dream Course was digitally re-released for the Wii Virtual Console in 2007, and the Wii U Virtual Console in Japan in 2013. It is one of thirty games included in the Super NES Classic Edition miniconsole.

In 1995, Nintendo and HAL began work on a sequel named Kirby Ball 64/Kirby Bowl 64 for the then-upcoming Nintendo 64. It was shown off as a playable demo at Nintendo's annual Shoshinkai trade show, alongside Super Mario 64. Kirby Ball 64/Kirby Bowl 64 was designed to take advantage of the system's analog stick to allow for more precise movement, in addition to utilizing gouraud shading for its graphics. It also featured an additional gamemode where the player controlled Kirby on a snowboard. The sequel was never released, though some of its concepts were later implemented into Kirby Air Ride (2003).

Reception

Kirby's Dream Course received praise for its wacky nature and innovation. GamePro writer Scary Larry claimed it was just as refined and fun to play as earlier games in the Kirby series. A writer for Next Generation found its mini golf-inspired gameplay unique compared to other games, as did a reviewer from Electronic Gaming Monthly. Next Generation and Larry also highlighted Dream Courses complexity, which was uncommon for a golf game at the time. The game's colorful visuals were also praised for their offbeat design and sense of humor. Electronic Gaming Monthly noted that the game's controls required time getting used to; Larry added the accuracy of the player's shots were sometimes questionable and not well-refined. Tom Guise of Computer and Video Games believed its originality made it one of the best SNES games, which Electronic Gaming Monthly agreed with. Javier Abad, a reviewer for Nintendo Acción, commented on the game's difference in design from other games in the series, but felt Kirby fans would enjoy it for the controls and graphical style.

Retrospective commentary on Dream Course has also been favorable. Staff from Nintendo Life compared its silliness to Electronic Arts' Zany Golf (1988), and that it possessed fun gameplay and a balanced level of difficulty. They also believed its isometric perspective worked well, and its graphics were aesthetically-pleasing. IGNs Lucas M. Thomas believed Dream Courses unique concept  made it incomparable to other games. Thomas and GameSpots Frank Provo both enjoyed its power-ups for their usefulness and novelty. USgamer writer Nadia Oxford applauded its abnormal level design and comical presentation, and said it offered a break from the more action-oriented games on the console: "Kirby's Dream Course isn't the most exciting game on the SNES Classic Edition, but it's cute, fuzzy, and fun – much like the big pink macaron who runs the course." IGN ranked the game 38th on their "Top 100 SNES Games of All Time."

Notes

References

External links

1994 video games
Fantasy sports video games
HAL Laboratory games
Kirby (series) video games
Miniature golf video games
Super Nintendo Entertainment System games
Video games developed in Japan
Video games with isometric graphics
Virtual Console games for Wii
Virtual Console games for Wii U
Nintendo Switch Online games
Virtual Console games for Nintendo 3DS